Payette River Wildlife Management Area at  is an Idaho wildlife management area in Payette County near New Plymouth along the Payette River. Land was first purchased by the Idaho Department of Fish and Game in 1960. 

The WMA consists of several units, including the  Birding Islands segment. Canada geese and other waterfowl are abundant in the WMA, but large mammals are scarce.

References

Protected areas established in 1960
Protected areas of Payette County, Idaho
Wildlife management areas of Idaho